Newgate Mall is an enclosed shopping mall in Ogden, Utah. Opened in 1981, it features Burlington Coat Factory, Dillard's, and a Cinemark movie theater. It is managed by The Woodmont Company.

History
Homart Development Company built Newgate Mall in 1981. Its original anchor stores were Sears and Mervyn's. Sears had operated a store on the site prior to the mall opening, but moved to a new location upon construction of the mall while selling their previous location to Mervyn's. The mall was built by Homart Development Company, then a shopping mall development company owned by Sears.

Among its tenants was the first Chick-fil-A in Utah. Phar-Mor was added in February 1992, but closed only seven months later.

In 1994, Dillard's opened its second Utah store at the mall. Another new tenant in this timespan was a larger location for Quilted Bear, a consignment shop that had previously occupied a smaller store within.

A year later, the former Phar-Mor became the first Oshman's in Utah. The store became Gart Sports in 2001, Sports Authority in 2006, and DownEast Home & Clothing in 2016. A 14 screen Cinemark "Tinseltown USA" movie theater was opened in 1998 to replace the mall's aging 4 screen cinema. Although Newgate Mall initially struggled with high vacancy, the mall's occupancy was boosted in the 2000s, particularly after Ogden City Mall (now The Junction) closed. Mervyn's closed in 2008 and became Burlington Coat Factory in 2013. Sears closed in April 2018.

References

Buildings and structures in Ogden, Utah
Shopping malls established in 1981
Shopping malls in Utah
Tourist attractions in Ogden, Utah
1981 establishments in Utah